Periscepsia is a genus of bristle flies in the family Tachinidae.

Species
Subgenus Periscepsia Gistel, 1848
Periscepsia abbreviata (Mesnil, 1950)
Periscepsia amicula (Mesnil, 1950)
Periscepsia anacantha (Loew, 1847)
Periscepsia carbonaria (Panzer, 1798)
Periscepsia handlirschi (Brauer & von Bergenstamm, 1891)
Periscepsia lindneri (Mesnil, 1959)
Periscepsia meyeri (Villeneuve, 1930)
Periscepsia misella (Villeneuve, 1937)
Periscepsia nudinerva (Mesnil, 1950)
Periscepsia umbrinervis (Villeneuve, 1937)
Subgenus Petinarctia Villeneuve, 1928
Periscepsia stylata (Brauer & von Bergenstamm, 1891)
Subgenus Ramonda Robineau-Desvoidy, 1863
Periscepsia barbata Mesnil, 1963
Periscepsia cinerosa (Coquillett, 1902)
Periscepsia clesides (Walker, 1849)
Periscepsia cleui (Herting, 1980)
Periscepsia delphinensis (Villeneuve, 1922)
Periscepsia helymus (Walker, 1849)
Periscepsia jugorum (Villeneuve, 1928)
Periscepsia labradorensis (Brooks, 1945)
Periscepsia laevigata (Wulp, 1890)
Periscepsia latifrons (Zetterstedt, 1844)
Periscepsia plorans (Rondani, 1861)
Periscepsia polita (Brooks, 1945)
Periscepsia prunaria (Rondani, 1861)
Periscepsia prunicia (Herting, 1969)
Periscepsia ringdahl (Villeneuve, 1922)
Periscepsia rohweri (Townsend, 1915)
Periscepsia spathulata (Fallén, 1820)
Periscepsia zarema Richter, 1976
Unplaced to subgenus
Periscepsia canina (Mesnil, 1950)
Periscepsia caviceps (Emden, 1960)
Periscepsia decolor (Emden, 1960)
Periscepsia fratella (Villeneuve, 1938)
Periscepsia glossinicornis (Emden, 1960)
Periscepsia gravicornis (Loew, 1847)
Periscepsia guttipennis (Emden, 1960)
Periscepsia kirbyiformis (Emden, 1960)
Periscepsia natalica (Emden, 1960)
Periscepsia nigra (Bigot, 1857)
Periscepsia pallidipennis (Emden, 1960)
Periscepsia philippina (Townsend, 1928)
Periscepsia propleuralis (Emden, 1960)
Periscepsia rufitibia (Villeneuve, 1938)
Periscepsia salti (Emden, 1960)
Periscepsia turkmenica Richter, 1991
Periscepsia vidua (Mesnil, 1950)

References

Dexiinae
Diptera of Europe
Diptera of Asia
Diptera of Africa
Tachinidae genera
Taxa named by Johannes von Nepomuk Franz Xaver Gistel